Guelph is a city in Ontario, Canada.

Guelph may also refer to:

 Guelph (electoral district), consisting of the City of Guelph, Ontario
 Guelph (provincial electoral district), as the above
 University of Guelph, in the same city
 House of Welf, also known as the House of Guelph, a European noble family
 Guelphs and Ghibellines, political factions in medieval Italy
 Guelph Treasure, a collection of German medieval art
 The Guelph Party, an alternative name for the German-Hanoverian Party, a historical conservative political party in the German Empire and the Weimar Republic